The Silver Gloves is an annual competition for amateur boxing in the United States.  The contest is sponsored by Ringside, Inc.  

The Silver Gloves are open to all non-professional pugilists age 10 to 15 years old.  The Silver Gloves is not the Golden Gloves amateur tournament, which is for amateur pugilists age 16 and over.

See also
NCAA Boxing Championship
Golden Gloves

External links
Official site

Amateur boxing